Arapahoe (also spelled Arrapahoe) was one of the first settlements in what is now the U.S. state of Colorado.  Nothing remains of the now deserted ghost town in Jefferson County, except a historical marker on the south side of 44th Avenue, between the towns of Golden and Wheat Ridge.

History
Gold prospectors founded Arapahoe City on November 29, 1858 during the advent of the Pikes Peak gold rush.  The town was laid out by George B. Allen, and according to founding treasurer Thomas L. Golden in a letter to the Missouri Republican it was named after the Arapaho tribe after chiefs warned residents to "quit their country".  Arapahoe City was a base camp town laid out on a grid to serve miners washing placer gold from nearby Clear Creek.  The placer, Arapahoe Bar, had been discovered by the Estes Party as far back as 1834 and mined in earnest since 1858.  The town, which was the fourth founded in northern Colorado, was then within western Kansas Territory.  The 1860 census found 80 people living at "Arrapahoe City," including 17 females.  An Arapahoe Post Office operated from January 17, 1860, until October 12, 1861.  Arapahoe had fifty houses, ranging from tents to log cabins and buildings.

But the easily accessible parts of the placers were quickly exhausted, and the rapid growth of the town of Golden a few miles west caused many in Arapahoe to physically move their log buildings to Golden, so that by the end of 1860, Arapahoe City had shrunk to just a few cabins.  By 1867, the town was entirely gone.

Arapahoe Bar was later mined by hydraulic mining (1880s) and dredge mining (1904–07), featuring two of the pioneer electric mining dredges in the west, operated by Herman J. Reiling and the National Dredging Company.  The company used the last remaining buildings of Arapahoe City for quarters, but before long all evidence of the town had vanished.  The site of Arapahoe City is virtually destroyed today.  No Arapahoe City buildings are known to have survived, though it is possible some may have been moved to nearby Golden or Fairmount, the farming community descended from Arapahoe City.  The two dredges, not advanced enough to save large amounts of the fine gold at Arapahoe Bar, were disassembled, one taken to French Gulch near Breckenridge, Colorado and its twin taken to the American River around Sacramento, California.  The fate of the California dredge remains unknown, while the remains of the dredge at Breckenridge, now known as the Reiling Dredge, are being preserved.

Prominent Citizens
 Thomas L. Golden, whom Golden, Colorado is named after
 John Hamilton Gregory, Colorado gold discoverer around present-day Central City, Colorado
 George Andrew Jackson, Colorado gold discoverer around present-day Idaho Springs, Colorado

Geography

See also
List of ghost towns in Colorado

References

Ghost towns in Colorado
Former populated places in Jefferson County, Colorado